This is a list of department stores. In the case of department store groups the location of the flagship store is given. This list does not include large specialist stores, which sometimes resemble department stores.

Note: "trading" is British English for "in operation".

Africa

Botswana 
 Choppies
 Game
 Woolworths
 Sefalana
 Spar
 Pep
 Pick n Pay Stores

Ghana 
 Melcom
 Shoprite
 Woolworths - stores closed in 2019

Kenya 
 Tuskys
 Naivas
 Uchumi Supermarkets
 Carrefour
 Game

Nigeria 
 Game
 Shoprite
 Spar

South Africa 
 Ackermans
 Cash & Carry
 Checkers
 Edgars
 Makro
 Pep
 Pick n Pay Stores
 Shoprite
 Spar
 Truworths
 Woolworths
 Game

Tanzania 
 Game
 Shoprite
 Uchumi
 Woolworths

Tunisia 
 Carrefour
 Géant

Zimbabwe 
 Edgars

North America

Canada 
Currently trading:
 Canadian Tire – auto repair garage, hardware, home renovations, sports, garden centre, electronics, auto parts, furniture, food, housewares, towels; franchised stores with independent owners
 Costco – Canadian unit of US-based chain; warehouse superstore, food, electronics, furniture, clothing, car repair
 Fields – discount chain owned by FHC Holdings Ltd.; chain was purchased by Hudson's Bay Company in 1981 but broke away in 2012
 Hart - Department store chain founded in 1960. Stores located across Quebec, Ontario and New Brunswick.
 Holt Renfrew – high-end department store
 Holt Renfrew Ogilvy – high-end department store in Montreal
 Hudson's Bay – department store owned by Hudson's Bay Company (HBC). Formerly called The Bay
 Nordstrom – US-based high end department store
 The North West Company – retail, primarily northern and smaller towns
 Real Canadian Superstore - chain of grocery stores that also carry electronics, fashion, household items and have instore services such as pharmacies, wine shops, GoodLife Fitness locations and gas stations. Located in five provinces in Canada.
 Saks Fifth Avenue – high-end department store
 Simons – Department store founded in 1840. Stores in Québec, Ontario, Alberta and British Columbia.
 Taylor's – Quebec department store
 Walmart Canada – part of US multinational Walmart
 Winners/Homesense/Marshalls – part of US company TJX Companies

Defunct:
 Adilman's Department Store – Saskatoon, SK (1921–1974)
 Army & Navy Stores
 Ayre and Sons – Newfoundland-based department store chain; once operated as many as 80 stores coast-to-coast (1859–1991)
 Biway – discount store based in Ontario, defunct 2001
 The Bon Marché – independent discount variety store in St. John's, Newfoundland 1919–1971
 Bowring Brothers – St. John's, NL, department store, also national home decor store chain 1811–2019
 Bretton's – high-end department store, 1985–1996
 Caban – Club Monaco's Home Store, 2000–2006
 Caplan's – Ottawa, Ontario department store; founded in 1897, closed in 1984
 Consumers Distributing – Canadian catalogue discount retailer (formerly Consumers Distributing Ltd., 1957 to 1996)
 Eaton's – went bankrupt in 1999; acquired by Sears Canada; defunct in 2002; as with the closure of Woodward's a decade earlier (see below), the vacancies left by Eaton's stores sparked a number of major shopping mall renovations and reconfigurations across the country
 Freimans – longtime Ottawa retailer, acquired by the Bay in 1972
 Home Outfitters – home goods store, subsidiary of Hudsons Bay Company, 1999–2019
 Horizon – discount department store operated by Eaton's, 1967–1978
 Kmart Canada – discount department store, usually in the suburbs, created by S.S. Kresge  sold Canadian stores to Hudson's Bay Company in 1997; many of these stores closed outright; the few that remained were converted to HBC's Zellers banner
 Laliberté – Quebec City department store, founded in 1867, closed 2020
 Larocque's Department Store 1923–1971 Ottawa, Ontario; constructed in 1923 to cater to the Francophone community of Lowertown; William Noffke made additions to the space in 1930; Management and ownership taken over by Joe Vineberg 1931 with relatives Harry and Sol Goodman of New Glasgow, Nova Scotia. Closed circa 1970–1971; now the Mercury Court Building, housing offices of Barry Padolsky Associates Inc. and shops. Barry Padolsky Associates Inc. renovated and expanded the space from 1989 to 1993. Features include a Mercury weathervane by the American sculptor W. H. Mullen, which was rescued from the Sun Life Building, demolished in 1949. The building was included amongst other architecturally interesting and historically significant buildings in Doors Open Ottawa, 2012.
 Goodman Department Store- New Glasgow-Antigonish-Truro in Nova Scotia-Ottawa-Montreal. Established in 1904 by Harry Goodman, his brother Sol Goodman and the Vineburg Family under the name Vineburg Goodman & Co. Goodman's was northern Nova Scotia's first and largest department store with 34 departments. The Ottawa store operated under the name of Larocque noted above. Goodman Co. closed in Antigonish, New Glasgow and Truro in 1984–1985. The stores were redeveloped shopping centres in Antigonish by developer Brian MacLeod and in New Glasgow the largest store by Brian MacLeod, and lawyers Richard Goodman Q.C. (grandson of former owner) and Gregory MacDonald Q.C.
 LW Stores – furniture, hardware, home, grocery, health & beauty, clothing liquidation retailer
 Marks & Spencer – British retailer's Canadian stores first opened 1973 and closed 1999
 Metropolitan – discount department store chain (1908–1997); sister chain of SAAN Stores and Greenberg Stores, later converted to the SAAN name
 Miracle Mart – discount grocery store operated by Steinberg's, defunct 1992; some outlets of the spinoff grocery chain, Miracle Food Mart, were acquired by Dominion Stores
 Morgan's – merged with Hudson's Bay Company
 Murphy-Gamble – Ottawa store, acquired by Simpson's
 Ogilvy's (Charles Ogilvy Limited) – Ottawa-area chain, merged with Robinson's in the 1980s, defunct 1990s
 Compagnie Paquet – Quebec City department store; founded in 1850; merged with Syndicat de Québec in the 1970s, closed in 1981
 Peoples – 1914–1995; discount store closed at the same time as its parent company Wise Stores; not to be confused with the Canadian jewelry store chain
 Pollack – Quebec City department store; two stores in Quebec City and one in Montreal; operated from 1915 to 1978
 Prange & Prangeway – H. C. Prange Co.; opened in 1887; chain was acquired by Younkers in the autumn of 1992
 S&R Department Store – discount store in Kingston (1959–2009) and Belleville.
 S.S. Kresge – smaller, downtown locations
 SAAN Stores – discount stores (1947–2008); most of chain's locations and SAAN name bought on asset basis by The Bargain! Shop
 Sam's Club – opened 2005 and expanded to 6 locations; closed in 2009
 Sayvette – discount department store, defunct 1970s
 Sears Canada – Canadian unit of Sears (1984–2018)
 Sentry – Ontario chain of retail department stores; various locations from Sarnia to Kingston; founded in 1961 by Samuel Joseph Lipson (August 15, 1911 – November 12, 2006). A discount department store with the slogan "Sentry – Guards your dollar", this small regional chain closed in the early 1980s.
 Shop-Rite – catalogue store operated by Hudson's Bay Company, 1970s-1982
 Simpson's – acquired by the Hudson's Bay Company and closed 1991; name now owned by Sears Canada 2001–2008; now owned by 1373639 Alberta Ltd, a Sears Canada shell company
 Simpsons-Sears Limited – name retired and renamed Sears Canada Inc.; 1952–1984
 Spencer's – Western Canada, bought by Eaton's
 Syndicat de Quebec – Quebec City department store; founded in 1867; closed in 1981
 Target – Newfoundland discount variety store chain (1981–1995); never related to the American company
 Target Canada – part of US giant Target Corporation (2013–2015)
 Towers Department Stores/BoniMart – sold to Zellers in 1990 and name retired in 1991, with closure of final stores
 Wise Stores – similar to Hart Stores
 Woodward's – Western Canada; defunct 1993; most stores converted to Zellers and The Bay; its closure sparked a wave of major renovations and reconfigurations in malls across Canada between 1993 and the early 2000s
 Woolco – discount department store, usually in the suburbs, acquired by Wal-Mart in 1994
 Woolworth's – closed Canadian stores in 1994, though some became Woolco (such as the Whitehorse outlet); others that did not close outright were reconfigured and rebranded as The Bargain! Shop
 XS Cargo – discount retailer chain dealing in clearance items; defunct 2014
 Yaohan – single location in Vancouver of Japanese chain in the late 1990s
 Zellers – discount retailer chain (1931–2020), store leases purchased by Target Canada in 2011, with brand name replaced & stores changed to Target in 2013. The last two stores using the Zellers name, were closed in 2020.

El Salvador 
 Carrion – department store chain in El Salvador
 Sears
 Siman – department store chain in Central America with stores in Nicaragua, Guatemala, and Costa Rica
Defunct:
 Sanborns – branch of Mexico's exclusive department store chain

Mexico 
 C&A
 Cimaco
 Liverpool – biggest department store chain in Mexico
 El Palacio de Hierro – high-end department store
 Saks Fifth Avenue – US-based high-end department store
 Sanborns – division of Carso Comercial, nationwide, famous for their coffee-shop-style restaurant, bars, and compact merchandise areas selling limited selections of giftable merchandise, pharmacy, newsstand, and cosmetics.
 Sears Roebuck de México – division of Carso Comercial
 Suburbia

Puerto Rico 

 Burlington Coat Factory
 Capri (department store)
 J. C. Penney
 Kmart
 Macy's
 Marshalls
 Sears
 T.J. Maxx
 Topeka
 Walmart

United States

South America

Argentina 

Defunct:
 Casa Tía
 Harrods

Bolivia 
 Big Sur
 Ketal

Brazil 
Currently trading:
 C&A
 Daslu
 Lojas Americanas
 Lojas Renner
 Lojas Riachuelo
 Máquina de Vendas

Defunct:
 Mappin
 Mesbla
 Muricy
 Sears

Chile 
Currently trading:
 Almacenes París – belongs to the Cencosud Group
 Falabella – largest and oldest department store in Chile
 La Polar
 Ripley
 Abcdin

Defunct:
 J. C. Penney – two stores in Santiago area (one in Alto Las Condes as a full-store, one in Parque Arauco as an only-furniture store); closed because of poor sales in 1999; converted to Almacenes París and Casa&Ideas stores.
 Gala-Sears – five stores (one full store and four minor stores) in Santiago area; Chilean division of Sears; closed because of poor sales in 1983; converted to Falabella.
 Muricy – two stores in Santiago area; closed because of bankruptcy in 1990; converted to Almacenes París.

Supermarkets and discount stores:
 Jumbo – supermarket chain, belongs to the Cencosud Group
 Líder – supermarket chain, belongs to the D&S Company, a Walmart joint venture

Colombia 
Currently trading:
 Casa Tía
 Falabella – Chilean company; opened first store in Colombia in 2006
 Flamingo
 Makro

Defunct:
 Sears
 La Polar
 Ripley

Ecuador 
 Almacenes Tía
 Almacenes De Prati – department store and retail business; clothing, shoes, accessories, cosmetics, and home goods
 Comandato

Paraguay 
 Nueva Americana

Peru 
Currently trading:
 Falabella
 Oeschle
 Ripley

Defunct:
 Almacenes París – was end operations in 2020
 Saga – sold to Falabella (Chile) and rebranded as Saga Falabella in 1995

Supermarkets and discount stores
  Metro - hypermarket property of Chilean Cencosud
 Plaza Vea – hypermarket property of Supermercados Peruanos
 Tottus – hypermarket property of Chilean Falabella Holdings
 Vivanda – supermarket property of Supermercados Peruanos
 Wong – supermarket property of Chilean Cencosud

Uruguay 
Defunct:
 London París

Venezuela 
Currently trading:
 Graffiti
 Macuto
 Traki

Defunct:
 Sears - sold to Organización Cisneros in 1984, rebranded to Maxy's until it became defunct in 1995.

Supermarkets and discount stores
 Makro
 Rattan

Asia

Brunei 
 Hua Ho Department Store
 Utama Grand Superstore
 Jaya Hypermart
 Soon Lee Department Store
 Milimewah
 TM Majid

Cambodia 
 Aeon

China 
 China Resources Vanguard
 Beijing Hualian
 C&A
 Dashang Group
 Isetan and Mitsukoshi Department Stores
 Jiuguang Department Store
 Pacific Sogo
 Parkson

Defunct:
 Seiyu – sold to Beijing Hualian Group
 Wing On – after civil war in 1949, the store's business moved outside China to Hong Kong; its properties and asset in China were nationalized under the Communist system
 Yaohan

Hong Kong 
Currently trading:
 APiTA
 c!ty'super – since 1996
 Citistore
 Harvey Nichols
 JUSCO – part of AEON Group
 Lane Crawford – since 1850
 Marks & Spencer
 New World Development
 Seibu Department Stores
 Sincere Department Store – since 1900
 Sogo – since 1980
 Wing On – since 1907
YATA – since 1990 as Seiyu. Sold in 2000 to Sun Hung Kai, rebranded as YATA in 2008

Defunct:
 Daimaru – closed in 1998
 Isetan
 Matsuzakaya
 Seiyu – locations sold to Sun Hung Kai in 2000, now operates as YATA
 Tokyu
 Yaohan – bankrupt in 1997

India 
 1-India Family Mart
 Big Bazaar
 Central
 Easyday
 Foodworld
 HyperCity
 Nilgiri's
 Cromā
 D-Mart
 Debenhams
 Lifestyle Stores
 Marks & Spencer
 Maveli Stores
 Metro
 More
 Namdhari's Fresh
 Pantaloons
 Reliance Retail
 Reliance Fresh
 Reliance Trends
 Safal
 Shoppers' Stop
 Spar
 Spencer's
 Triveni Supermarkets
 Westside

Indonesia 
Currently trading:
 Foreign department store brands:
 ÆON – Jakarta, Tangerang, Bogor
Galeries Lafayette – Jakarta
 Lotte – Jakarta
 LuLu – Jakarta, Tangerang
 M&S – Jakarta, Tangerang, Bandung, Surabaya, Bali, Medan
 Metro – Jakarta, Bandung, Surabaya, Makassar, Solo
 Sogo – Jakarta, Tangerang, Surabaya, Bali, Medan, Samarinda
 Seibu – Jakarta
 Local department store brands:
Citrus – Bogor, Jakarta, Semarang
 Lima Cahaya – Kalimantan
 Matahari – nationwide
 Ramayana – nationwide
 Robinson – nationwide
 Cahaya – nationwide
 Sarinah  – Jakarta
 Surya – Papua
 Transmart – nationwide
 Yogya - Java

Defunct
 Debenhams
 Harvey Nichols
 JCPenney
Printemps (cancelled opening in 1997)
Yaohan
Hanshin (cancelled opening in 1997)
Parkson
Centro – local department store brand
Lotus – local department store brand

Israel 
 Castro
 Hamashbir Lazarchan
 Honigman

Japan

Laos 
 Big C

Macau 
 New Yaohan

Defunct:
 Yaohan

Malaysia 
Currently trading:
 Aeon
 Debenhams (3 stores)
 G2000
 Isetan (4 stores)
 Marks & Spencer – branches in 1 Utama, Gurney Plaza, Sunway Pyramid, and Suria KLCC.
 Metrojaya (6 stores)
 Pacific
 Padini (28 stores)
 Parkson (37 stores)
 Parkwell (only at Sarawak and Sabah Region)
 Robinsons (2 branches in KL)
 Sogo
 SaSa (56 stores)
 Tangs – A store in Starhill Center, KL but closed down in 2004; made their comeback debut at Pavilion KL before Pavilion branch closed down. Currently have branches at 1 Utama, Empire Subang, Genting Grand Hotel & First World Plaza (including a factory store outlet at Genting Premium Outlets) and The Shore, Melaka.
Defunct:
 Makro
 Printemps
 Yaohan – branches taken over by Parkson

Pakistan 
 Debenhams
 Makro
 Metro

Philippines 
 Debenhams
 Isetann
 Manels
 Marks & Spencer
 SM Store

Saudi Arabia 
 Debenhams
 Harvey Nichols (Riyadh)
 Marks & Spencer
 Saks Fifth Avenue

Singapore 
Currently trading:
 Beijing Hualian Group – formerly known as Seiyu Group (Bugis Junction, Lot 1, The Clementi Mall, Jurong Point, Junction 8)
 Isetan (Shaw House and Centre, Tampines Mall, Parkway Parade, NEX)
 Metro (Paragon, Causeway Point)
 Mustafa (Little India)
 Robinson & Co.
Marks & Spencer – franchise (313@Somerset, Jewel Changi Airport, Marina Square, One Raffles Place, Paragon, Plaza Singapura, Parkway Parade Vivocity, Waterway Point, Wheelock Place)
 Takashimaya (Ngee Ann City)
 Tangs (Tang Plaza - Orchard Road, VivoCity)
OG (Chinatown, Bugis, Orchard Road)

Defunct:
 Daimaru – branches now closed in Singapore
 Lane Crawford – branches now closed in Singapore
 Sogo – branches now closed in Singapore
 Tokyu – branches now closed in Singapore
 Robinson & Co.
John Little – branches now closed in Singapore
Robinsons – branches now closed in Singapore
 Yaohan – branches now closed in Singapore

South Korea 
 AK Plaza – five branches throughout the country, Main shop in Guro, SW Seoul and Bundang new city and Suwon & Pyeongtaek station shop, A AeKyung group company 
 Galleria Department Store – six or five branches throughout South Korea, because EAST and WEST are considered one store in Gangnam, Southern Seoul, Main department store in Daejeon & Cheninan, Chungnam area. A Hanwha group subsidiary.
 Happy World (Haengbokhan Sesang)  Department Store – Yangcheon-gu, Mokdong, Seoul
 Hyundai Department Store – 15 branches throughout the country main brand in Gangnam Apgujeong dong & Gangnam coex shop, Pangyo new city  & Kintex shop at NE Seoul exhibition center
 Lotte Department Store – more than 30 branches throughout the country, including three Young Plazas and one Avenuel at jamsil 123-storey skyscraper mall complex, 8 overseas branches in Russia, Moscow, China, Vietnam, Hanoi, and Indonesia, Jakarta The top department stores with Lotte hotel complex.
 M Department Store – Chuncheon, Gangwon-do
 NC Department Store - Part of E-land group company, it has 19 branches throughout the nation including Seoul Garden 5 mall, Southern Seoul along with Hyudnai city mall. 
 Say Department Store – Seo-gu, Daejeon
 Shinsegae Department Store – 13 branches throughout the country including Myeongdong shop and starfield mall in Hanam SE Seoul & Goyang, Northern Seoul. 
 Taepyung Department Store – Dongjak-gu, Seoul

Defunct:
 Printemps – Seoul branch (1988~1997)
 Sampoong Department Store – collapsed due to building weakness in 1995 (1989~1995)

Sri Lanka 
Currently trading:
 Barefoot
 Cargills
 ODEL

Taiwan 
 Breeze Center
 Dayeh Takashimaya
 Hayashi Department Store
 Ming Yao Department Store
 Far Eastern Sogo
 Shin Kong Mitsukoshi

Thailand 
Currently trading:
 Big C
 Central Retail Corporation – group includes:
 Central
 Marks & Spencer – franchise stores
 Robinson
 ZEN (Ratchaprasong)
 Daiso Grand
 Diana (Hat Yai-Songkhla, Pattani)
 The Erawan Group – group includes:
 Ploenchit Center (Sukhumvit)
 Esprit
 Forever 21
 G2000
 Gap
 Gaysorn Group – group includes:
 Amarin Plaza (Ratchaprasong) – taken over from the Erawan Group
 Gaysorn Plaza (Ratchaprasong)
 H&M
 Klang Plaza Group – group includes:
 Klang Plaza (Nakhon Ratchasima)
 Klang Villa (Nakhon Ratchasima)
 The Mall Group – group includes:
 Emporium (Sukhumvit)
 EmQuartier (Sukhumvit)
 The Mall
 The Paragon (Khet Pathum Wan)
 Pantip Plaza (Pratunam Market)
 Siam Piwat – group includes:
 Siam Center (Khet Pathum Wan)
 Siam Discovery (Khet Pathum Wan)
 Tesco Lotus Department Store
 Tokyu (MBK Center, Khet Pathum Wan)
 Topland Group (Phitsanulok) – group includes:
 Topland Arcade
 Topland Plaza
 Uniqlo
 Zara

Defunct:
 Carrefour
 Thai Daimaru
 JUSCO – closed department store section and changed supermarket name section to Maxvalu Tokai
 Printemps
 Seiyu
 Sogo
 Yaohan

United Arab Emirates 
Currently trading:
 Bloomingdale's (The Dubai Mall)
 Carrefour
 Debenhams
 Galeries Lafayette (The Dubai Mall)
 Harvey Nichols (Mall of the Emirates)
 LuLu Hypermarkets, Supermarkets & Department Stores
 Marks & Spencer
Defunct:
 Saks Fifth Avenue (2004-2016)
 House of Fraser (2013-2021)
 Robinsons (2017-2021)

Vietnam 
 AEON
 Big C
 Diamond Plaza (HCMC)
 Lotte
 Parkson
 Takashimaya

Lebanon 
 Aishti
 BHV
 Farra Design Center

Europe

Albania 
 Coin – part of Gruppo Coin (Italy)
 OVS – part of Gruppo Coin (Italy)

Austria 
 Kastner & Öhler

Belgium 
 Galeria Inno – part of the German GALERIA Holding GmbH (Galeria Kaufhof)

Bulgaria 
 TZUM- dismantled in the 1990s. Several modern malls function in Sofia, Varna, Bourgas, etc.

Czech Republic 
 Bílá Labuť
 Kotva
 Desirred

Cyprus 
 Debenhams – operated by Ermes Department Stores Ltd
 Marks & Spencer

Denmark 
Currently trading:
 Illum (Copenhagen)
 Magasin du Nord (Copenhagen, Lyngby, Field's, Rødovre, Aarhus, Odense and Aalborg)
 Salling (Aarhus and Aalborg)

Defunct:
 Anva
 Daell's
 Debenhams

Estonia 
Currently trading:
 Stockmann
Defunct:
 Anttila
 Marks & Spencer

Finland 
Currently trading:
 Marks & Spencer
 Sokos
 Stockmann

Defunct:
 Anttila
 Pukeva

France 
 Le BHV Marais
 Galeries Lafayette
 Le Bon Marché
 Printemps

Defunct:
 La Samaritaine – to be transformed
 Prisunic – acquired by Monoprix
 Uniprix – acquired by Monoprix

Germany 
Currently trading:
 Alsterhaus – located in Hamburg, part of the KaDeWe Group
 Apropos – luxury department store / concept store, located in Cologne, Düsseldorf and Hamburg
 Breuninger – ten luxury department stores, with head office in Stuttgart
 Galeria Kaufhof – subsidiary of HBC and the leading German department store group
 Galeries Lafayette Berlin – Berlin branch of the French department store
 Hema – Dutch group operating 6 department stores in Germany
 KaDeWe – located in Berlin, part of the KaDeWe Group
 Ludwig Beck – luxury department store, founded in 1861, located in Munich
 Müller – not really a department store, more a large chemists that sells additional goods such as housewares, multi-media, toys
 Oberpollinger – located in Munich, part of the KaDeWe Group
Peek & Cloppenburg
 Woolworth – German branch of the Woolworth group, independent from the international Woolworth group, now German owned by the Tengelmann Group

Defunct:
 Hertie – merged with Karstadt
 Horten – merged with Kaufhof; all stores were renamed "Kaufhof" or "Galeria Kaufhof" or have been closed
 Karstadt – merged with Kaufhof
 Marks & Spencer
 Mitsukoshi – the German store has been closed
 Schocken – merged with Horten and later Kaufhof
 Wertheim

Greece 
Currently trading:
 Attica Department Stores, Attica at Golden Hall
 Fokas Department Stores (closed)
 Hondos Center – mainly cosmetics
 Notos Galleries

Hungary 
 Corvin
 Marks & Spencer
 Skala

Iceland 
 Debenhams
 Hagkaup

Ireland 
Currently trading:
 Arnotts
 Brown Thomas
 BT2 – subsidiary of Brown Thomas
 Dunnes Stores

Defunct:
 Clerys – closed in 2015
 Darrers
 Roches Stores – acquired by Debenhams

Foreign-Operated:
 Harvey Nichols
 House of Fraser
 Marks & Spencer

Italy 
 Aumai - Chinese department store
 Coin – part of Gruppo Coin
 Coin Excelsior – part of Gruppo Coin
 OVS – part of Gruppo Coin
 Rinascente – part of Central Group (Thailand)
 The Oriental Mall - Chinese department store in Milan
 UPIM – part of Gruppo Coin

Defunct:
 Gamma – acquired by Standa in 1973
 JCPenney – acquired by Rinascente in 1977
 Mas – department store in Rome, closed in 2017
 Standa – acquired by Gruppo Coin in 1998

Latvia 
 Elkor
 Maxima
 Rimi
 Stockmann

Lithuania 
 Akropolis
 CUP
 Europa
 Gedimino 9
 Ozas
 Panorama
 Maxima
 Lidl

Luxembourg 

Defunct:
 Monopol – sold its assets

Netherlands 
Currently trading:
 Berden – department store in Heerlen
 De Bijenkorf
 HEMA

Defunct:
 Maison de Bonneterie
 Metz & Co – department store in Amsterdam
 Schunck
 Vroom & Dreesmann
 Hudson's Bay

Norway 
 Christiania Glasmagasin
 Illum
 Eger
 Marks & Spencer
 Paleet
 Steen & Strøm
 OXHOLM

Poland 
 CDT 'Smyk'
 Jabłkowski Brothers

Portugal 
Currently trading:
 El Corte Inglés (Lisbon and Vila Nova de Gaia) – leading Spanish department store
 Marques Soares (Porto and branches)

Defunct:
 Grandella (Lisbon)
 Grandes Armazens do Chiado (Lisbon and branches)
 Marks & Spencer

Romania 
 Debenhams
 Marks & Spencer

Russia 
Currently trading:
 Gostiny Dvor – established 1785
 GUM
 Moscow
 The Passage – established 1848
 Petrovsky Passage – established 1906
 TsUM
 TAKE AWAY
 Stockmann - opened 1989

Serbia 
 Coin – part of Gruppo Coin (Italy)
 Marks & Spencer
 Robne kuće Beograd

Slovakia 
 Marks & Spencer

Slovenia 
 E. Leclerc
 Interspar
 Mercator
 Tuš

Spain 
Currently trading:
 El Corte Inglés – leading Spanish department store chain
 Dunnes Stores (Málaga)
 Galerías Aitana (Calpe)
 Galerías Primero (Zaragoza)
 Bide Onera (Barakaldo)
 Marks & Spencer

Defunct:
 Almacenes Al Pelayo (Oviedo)
 Almacenes Arias – closed in 1997
 Almacenes Botas (Oviedo and Gijón)
 Almacenes Madrid-París
 Almacenes Simeón – closed in 1987
 Galerías Preciados – taken over by El Corte Inglés in 1996
 Marks & Spencer – closed in 1996
 Sears – taken over by Galerías Preciados in 1983
 SEPU – the Australian owners closed the remaining four branches in 2002

Sweden 
Currently trading:
 Åhléns (Stockholm)
 Gekås (Ullared)
 Nordiska Kompaniet (Stockholm and Gothenburg)

Defunct:
 Debenhams – closed in 2007
 PUB (Stockholm) – closed in 2014

Switzerland 
 Coop City
 Globus – Zürich, Bern, Luzern, Sursee, Walisellen, Locarno, Dietlikon, Marin, Basel, Chur, St. Gallen, Lausanne and Genève
 Jelmoli – one flagship store located in Zürich
 Loeb (Swiss department store) (Bern and branches) – Biel, Thun and Schönbühl
 Manor (Basel and branches) – used to operate under different brands like Nordmann, Vilan, Rheinbrücke, Placette and Innovazione
 Migros – the largest supermarket chain, but acting as a department store in different shopping centers

Defunct:
 ABM (Au Bon Marché) – discount chain; was a part of the Globus group; closed 2001; some shops were converted to C&A stores
 EPA (Einheitspreis AG) – discount chain; closed 2005; most stores converted to Coop City or closed down

United Kingdom 

Major department stores currently trading
John Lewis
Marks & Spencer
House of Fraser
Harrods
Selfridges
Liberty
Harvey Nichols
Fortnum & Mason
Fenwick

Turkey 
 Beymen – luxury shopping
 Boyner
 Vakko – luxury shopping
 FashFed
 GANİ YALÇIN – luxury shopping
 Mudo
 Özdilek
 Harvey Nichols – luxury shopping
 Marks & Spencer
 Galeries Lafayette – luxury shopping
 Desibona – marketplace platform

Oceania

Australia 
Department stores:
 David Jones Limited
 Harris Scarfe
Harrolds
 Myer
 Peter's of Kensington
Discount department stores:
 Big W
Dimmeys
 Kmart Australia
 Target Australia
TK Maxx

Defunct:
 Allens (southern New South Wales and the ACT) - acquired by Harris Scarfe in 2004, re-branded in October 2008 - slogan in the 1990s was 'Hi-value'
 Aherns (Western Australia) - acquired by David Jones in 1999, last store in Rockingham Centre closed in June 2004
 Anthony Hordern & Sons (Sydney)
 Bairds (Perth)
 Ball & Welch (Melbourne)
 Barsby's (Kempsey)
 Bennett's (Geraldton) 
 Boans (Perth)
 Bolands (Cairns)
Bright & Hitchcocks
 Buckley & Nunn (Melbourne)
 Chain Reaction (Fremantle & Rockingham)
Charles Birks & Co.
Charles Davis Limited
 Charles Moore and Co. (Perth)
 Cox Bros Economic (Perth)
Cribb & Foote (Ipswich)
 Cronshaws (Bunbury)
 Daimaru (Melbourne Central and Pacific Fair)
Debenhams (St Collins Lane)
 Farmers
 Figgins Diorama
Fitzgerald's Department Stores (Tasmania)
 Fosseys
 Foy & Gibson (Melbourne)
 Georges (Melbourne)
 Gowings (Sydney)
 Grace Bros – now Myer
H. A. & W. Goode
 Hick Atkinson (Melbourne)
 Impulse (Perth)
James Marshall & Co. (Adelaide)
JB Young's
 John Martin's (Adelaide)
 Mantons (Melbourne)
Marcus Clark & Co
 Mark Foy's (Sydney)
 McDonnell & East Ltd
 McWhirters (Brisbane)
 The Mutual Store (Melbourne)
 Richardson's (Armidale)
 Snows (Sydney)
 Stirlings (Albany, Bunbury and Geraldton) - all stores sold to Harris Scarfe and Rebranded to the Harris Scarfe format
Trade Secret - rebranded to TK Maxx
 Treadways
 Venture
 Waltons
 Western Stores (New South Wales)

New Zealand 
Department Stores:
 Ballantynes (Christchurch)
 David Jones Limited
 Farmers - nationally trading
 H & J Smith
 Smith & Caughey's

Discount department stores:
 Kmart Australia
 The Warehouse

Defunct:
 Arthur Barnett
 D.I.C.
 DEKA
 Haywrights
 Kirkcaldie & Stains
Milne & Choyce (Auckland)

See also 
 List of convenience stores
 List of hypermarkets
 List of supermarket chains
 List of superstores

References 

Department Stores